Enicodes montrouzieri is a species of beetle in the family Cerambycidae. It was described by Xavier Montrouzier in 1861. It is known from New Caledonia. It feeds on Coffea arabica and Coffea canephora.

References

Enicodini
Beetles described in 1861